The Nikon Coolpix 5200 is a digital camera manufactured and distributed by Nikon. It features 5.1 megapixels, and a 3x optical/4x digital zoom. It is part of the Nikon Coolpix line of cameras Technology.

Announced in February 2004 (alongside an otherwise identical 4MP camera, the Coolpix 4200), the Coolpix 5200 represents the latest in a long line of ever-smaller Nikon compact cameras that stretches all the way back to the late 1990s. Although the Coolpix 5200 echoes the basic design of the previous generation of Nikon Compacts (the 3200 and 4200), it is a good deal smaller, thanks no doubt to the use of an all-metal (Aluminum) body, rather than Nikon's more usual plastics. Nikon has managed to squash an impressive amount of power into the 5200's diminutive body (which is only a shade larger than a credit card), including an all-new ED glass 3x zoom lens, automatic red-eye removal, 15 (count 'em) scene modes, scene-assist functions (with overlays to ensure you put the subject in the right part of the frame) and a 30 frames per second movie mode. Here's just a few of the Coolpix 5200's headline features:

References

5MP resolution
3x Nikkor ED zoom lens with aspherical element
Digital Zoom     4x
In-camera automatic red-eye removal
15 scene modes
640x480 pixel, 30fps movie mode
Best Shot Selector - takes a series of shots and chooses the sharpest for you
White Balance and exposure bracketing

External links

See also 
Wikipedia Article-Nikon Coolpix Series
Nikon Coolpix series
Nikon

5200
Cameras introduced in 2004